Sayed Suleiman is a cadet branch of the well-known Atassi (Atasi) family of Homs, Syria. The family descends from Sayed Suleiman Chalabi son of Sayed Abdullah Al-Atassi, a prominent religious figure in the 18th century and the head of the Atassi family of that time. The family belongs to the Hashemite-Husseini class, or Ashraf, descendants of the Islamic prophet Muhammad. Islamic court Registers of Homs show that Sayed Suleiman was a highly regarded figure, as evident by the titles given to him in formal address by the court. He was married to Jalla Al-Khaleq Al-Atassi, the daughter of his cousin, Ali Efendi Al-Atassi, the Grand Mufti of Homs. He died in 1775 leaving one son, Sayed Saleh Atassi. It is estimated that there are about 500–600 family members today in Homs and other places in the World. Some may still attach Atassi to their surname.

Syrian families